The 1968–69 Honduran Segunda División was the third season of the Honduran Segunda División.  Under the management of José Bejarano, Lempira F.C. won the tournament after defeating C.D. Broncos in the final series and obtained promotion to the 1969–70 Honduran Liga Nacional.

Final

 Lempira won 6–4 on aggregate.

References

Segunda
1968